Setzler is a surname. Notable people with the surname include:

 Dan Setzler
Ed Setzler (born 1970), American politician
Nikki G. Setzler (born 1945), American politician
 (born 1943), German historian and germanist